Magma  was a populated place situated in Pinal County, Arizona, United States.

Better known as Magma Junction, it is the junction of the Magma Arizona Railroad with the  Southern Pacific mainline, approximately 30 miles east of Superior.

See also
 Magma Arizona Railroad

References

Unincorporated communities in Pinal County, Arizona
Unincorporated communities in Arizona